The 1913–14 Harvard Crimson men's ice hockey season was the 17th season of play for the program.

Season
After paring the team down to 24 men, Harvard began its first year as a major sport with a tune-up game against the Boston Athletic Association. Soft ice and early-season jitters contributed to a less-than-stellar effort from the Crimson and they lost the match 1–3 while cycling through many of their alternate players. The loss was unfortunate but hardly damaging to their season. A bigger development was the continued and expanding interest of ice hockey for the student body. Undergraduates were so enamored with the idea of joining the team that a second squad of 34 men, completely separate from the Varsity and Freshman teams, was organized and a schedule arranged.

After the rather poor effort in the B. A. A. game, Harvard exploded out of the gate against MIT and did not take the pressure off all game, ending with a dominant 11–1 victory. The convincing victory demonstrated how the good the team could be as they embarked on their first ever holiday trip over the winter break. They would play Syracuse HC and Ottawa each twice with the team being billeted at the home of team captain Willetts in nearby Skaneateles.

The trip started well with the team producing a solid win against the Syracuse Club, but afterwards the results turned sour. Syracuse earned a split with a 2–1 win, then Ottawa strangled the Crimson offense, not allowing a goal in either of the two matches. The defense from Harvard, provided mostly by Willetts and Clafin, was notable but the lack of scoring punch doomed the Crimson from the start. The terrible results portended a bad season for the Crimson, and once they began their intercollegiate schedule began those predictions bore fruit.

Harvard could only just defeat Amherst a team they should have had not trouble against. Despite the close shaves, the Crimson alternates were gaining much needed game experience. Against Massachusetts Agricultural College the offense continued to struggle, showing up just in the nick of time to overcome a deficit in overtime and again escape with a one-goal victory. When the hosted Dartmouth the score was tight once more, but the team looked to be performing much more as a cohesive unit.

Their next game came against Princeton. Harvard had been a thorn in Princeton's side over the previous two years, being the only team to beat the Tigers the previous year. The Crimson defense had faced Princeton star Hobey Baker before and knew how to play against him. They used that experience to restrict the speedy Baker and keep the game tied for most of the contest. Even when Princeton opened the scoring it was a scant few minutes before the game was knotted at 1-all. Afterwards, no matter how hard the Tigers tried, they could not penetrate the stifling defense. A 14-minute overtime session was played to no effect, then an open-ended second overtime began and followed sudden-death rules. Harvard took full advantage of its many alternates while Princeton was forced to play with nearly the same seven players all game. The Tigers flagged from fatigue and in the 78th minute of what was scheduled as a 40-minute game, Saltonstall ended the game in Harvard's favor.

Harvard dropped their next game to McGill but when they faced Yale the four goal effort from Hopkins gave Harvard a chance at a second consecutive intercollegiate title. The Crimson had played each game over the previous month at the Boston Arena, however, and now they would have a second chance to prove their mettle on the road. When they met Yale in New Haven the Crimson were not prepared for the hard checking from the Elis and Yale pushed Harvard around for most of the game.

Three days later in a second rematch, Princeton could have tried to follow Yale's game plan but they stuck to their own high-octane game and simply outplayed the Crimson, scoring the final three goals in 4–2 victory. Worse for Harvard, Willetts and Philips were injured in the game and doubt was cast on their ability to compete in the final games against Princeton and Yale. Both players started the rubber match with Princeton a week later but it was clear that the Tigers were the better team. Despite keying their defense on Baker, the Tiger star could not be contained and assisted on three Princeton goals in a 4–1 victory.

Roster

Standings

Schedule and Results

|-
!colspan=12 style=";" | Regular Season

References

Harvard Crimson men's ice hockey seasons
Harvard
Harvard
Harvard
Harvard
Harvard